Owczarnia may refer to the following places:
Owczarnia, Kraśnik County in Lublin Voivodeship (east Poland)
Owczarnia, Opole Lubelskie County in Lublin Voivodeship (east Poland)
Owczarnia, Masovian Voivodeship (east-central Poland)
Owczarnia, Elbląg County in Warmian-Masurian Voivodeship (north Poland)
Owczarnia, Iława County in Warmian-Masurian Voivodeship (north Poland)
Owczarnia, Kętrzyn County in Warmian-Masurian Voivodeship (north Poland)
Owczarnia, Olsztyn County in Warmian-Masurian Voivodeship (north Poland)
Owczarnia, West Pomeranian Voivodeship (north-west Poland)